This is a list of the South Africa national football team results from 2010 to the present day.

Results
South Africa's score is shown first in each case.

Notes

References

External links

2010s in South Africa
2010s